Noreste is one of the regions of Yucatán, Mexico.

References 

Yucatán